"Careless Love" is a jazz standard

Careless Love may also refer to:

Careless Love (film), 2012 Australian drama film
Careless Love (album), jazz album by Madeleine Peyroux 2004
 "Careless Love", a 1987 single performed by German Neue Deutsche Welle duo, Annette Humpe and Inga Humpe.